The Northern Arizona Vocational Institute of Technology (NAVIT) is a joint technological education district in northern and eastern Arizona. It offers its programs to its constituent member school districts.

Member schools
Alchesay High School
Blue Ridge High School
Holbrook High School
Joseph City Junior/Senior High School
Mogollon High School
Payson High School (Arizona)
Round Valley High School
Show Low High School
Snowflake High School
St. Johns High School
Winslow High School

References
Public school/school district records from the Arizona Department of Education: 

School districts in Arizona